Christos Serelis (born August 21, 1974) is a Greek professional basketball coach who is currently the head coach for Panathinaikos of the Greek Basket League and the EuroLeague.

Coaching career
Serelis became the head coach of the Greek club Lavrio in 2005. With Lavrio, he won the Greek 4th Division championship in 2007, and the Greek 3rd Division championship in 2010.

On April 14, 2022, he left Lavrio in order to join Panathinaikos, as an assistant of Giorgos Vovoras. After the end of the season, he became once again the head coach of Lavrio.

On February 21, 2023, Serelis returned to Panathinaikos to serve as the head coach for the remainder of the season, after the firing of Dejan Radonjić and the rest of his staff.

References

External links
Eurobasket.com Coach Profile
Realgm.com Coach Profile

Living people
Greek basketball coaches
Lavrio B.C. coaches
Panathinaikos B.C. coaches
1974 births
Sportspeople from Attica
People from East Attica